Adymus or Adymos may refer to:

Adymus, brother of Europa, worshipped along with Britomartis, according to Strabo.
Adymus of Beroea (fl. 1st century AD), Macedonian sculptor
 Another name of Phaethon of Syria, guardian of the temples of Aphrodite

References

Ancient Greek religion